Bozal Spanish is a possible extinct Spanish-based creole language or pidgin that may have been a mixture of Spanish and Kikongo, with Portuguese influences.  Attestation is insufficient to indicate whether Bozal Spanish was ever a single, coherent or stable language, or if the term merely referred to any idiolect of Spanish that included African elements.

Etymology
Bozal is the Spanish word for "muzzle", and shares it etymology with the word bosal. In their New World colonies, the Spaniards distinguished between negros ladinos ("Latinate Negroes", those who had spent more than a year in a Spanish-speaking territory) and negros bozales (wild, untamed Negroes; those born in or freshly arrived from Africa).

Historic use
Bozal Spanish was spoken by African slaves in Cuba, Uruguay and other areas of South and Central America from the 17th century up until its possible extinction at around 1850. Although Bozal Spanish is extinct as a language, its influence still exists. In some Cuban folk religious rituals today, people speak what they call "Bozal". Similarly, many songs of the afro genre, which flourished in Cuba in the 1930s and '40s, contain lyrics reminiscent of the language.

In Puerto Rico esclavos bozales were slaves ("esclavos") brought from Africa, as opposed to those born in Puerto Rico from slaves. Such slaves spoke different languages, other than Spanish, which they eventually learned while enslaved. These slaves were primarily used in the fields and agriculture as opposed to those born under bondage who were generally used in domestic chores.

See also
Slavery in colonial Spanish America
Papiamento

References 

Afro-Cuban culture
Afro–Puerto Rican
Afro-Uruguayan culture
Democratic Republic of the Congo diaspora
Republic of the Congo diaspora
History of Puerto Rico
Kongo language
Portuguese-Caribbean culture
Spanish-based pidgins and creoles
Languages extinct in the 1850s
Languages of the African diaspora
Spanish language in the Americas
Creoles of the Americas